The East German Indoor Athletics Championships was an annual indoor track and field competition organised by the East German Athletics Association, which served as the national championship for the sport in East Germany. Typically held over two days in February during the German winter, it was first held in 1964.

The event was contested separately from the West German Indoor Athletics Championships until 1991, when the German Indoor Athletics Championships was held as the first Unified Germany championships. National indoor championships in racewalking and combined track and field events were usually contested at separate locations.

Events
The following athletics events featured as standard on the East German Indoor Championships programme:

 Sprint: 60 m, 200 m, 400 m
 Distance track events: 800 m, 1500 m, 3000 m
 Hurdles: 60 m hurdles
 Jumps: long jump, triple jump (men only), high jump, pole vault (men only)
 Throws: shot put
 Racewalking: 5000 m (men), 3000 m (women) 
 Combined events: heptathlon (men), pentathlon (women)

The 60 metres was set as the standard short sprint and short hurdles distance in 1978, with sprint and hurdles events being contested over 50 metres and 55 metres in earlier years. A 100-yard dash was held from 1973 to 1989 (100 metres in 1976 and 1977). The 200 m was introduced in 1983.

The men's 5000 m was introduced in 1976. A men's pentathlon was introduced in 1974, changing to heptathlon in 1981, with an octathlon being held in the period from 1987–89. The men's racewalking distance varied, with 10,000 m races from 1967–75 and 1982–88, 20,000 m during 1976–1981, then 5000 m at the final two editions.

The women's programme mostly matched the men's, with the exception of distance events which was introduced later. Women began to compete over 1500 m in 1970, 3000 m in 1981, 5000 m in 1989, and in racewalking in 1985. Women did not take part in triple jump or pole vault during the competition's lifetime.

Editions

References 

 
Athletics competitions in East Germany
National indoor athletics competitions
Recurring sporting events established in 1964
1964 establishments in East Germany
February sporting events
Athletics Indoor
Defunct athletics competitions